The men's 100 metres T54 took place in Stadium Australia.

There were two heats and one final round. The T54 is for athletes who have normal hand, arm and trunk function but no function in their legs.

Heats

Heat 1

Heat 2

Final round

References

Athletics at the 2000 Summer Paralympics